The 2014–15 New Orleans Privateers women's basketball team represented the University of New Orleans during the 2014–15 NCAA Division I women's basketball season. The Privateers, led by fourth year head coach Keeshawn Davenport, played their home games at Lakefront Arena. They are members of the Southland Conference.

Roster

Schedule
Source

|-
!colspan=9 style="background:#003399; color:#C0C0C0;"| Out of Conference Schedule

|-
!colspan=9 style="background:#003399; color:#C0C0C0;"| Southland Conference Schedule

See also
2014–15 New Orleans Privateers men's basketball team

References

New Orleans Privateers women's basketball seasons
New Orleans
New
New